Sumit Bhardwaj is an Indian actor who appears in television shows. He is best known for appearing as Neil Sareen in his debut series Shastri Sisters on Colors TV. His other shows include Beyhadh, Ayushman Bhava and Qayamat Ki Raat. Currently he is playing the role of Samar Pratap in Sasural Simar Ka 2.

Television

References

External links
 

Living people
Indian male television actors
Male actors in Hindi television
Place of birth missing (living people)
Year of birth missing (living people)